The 2000 Georgia Southern Eagles football team represented Georgia Southern University as a member of the Southern Conference (SoCon) during the 2000 NCAA Division I-AA football season. Led by fourth-year head coach Paul Johnson, the Eagles compiled an overall record of 13–2 with a mark of 7–1 in conference play, winning the SoCon title. Georgia Southern advanced to the NCAA Division I-AA Football Championship playoffs, where they defeated McNeese State in the first round, Hofstra in the quarterfinals, Delaware in the semifinals, and Montana Grizzlies] in the NCAA Division I-AA Football Championship Game, winning the program's second consecutive and sixth overall NCAA Division I-AA title. The Eagles played their home games at Paulson Stadium in Statesboro, Georgia.

Schedule

References

Georgia Southern
Georgia Southern Eagles football seasons
NCAA Division I Football Champions
Southern Conference football champion seasons
Georgia Southern Eagles football